The Rebecca Shoal Light was located on a treacherous coral bank, Rebecca Shoal,  west of the Marquesas Keys and  east of the Dry Tortugas.

The first attempt to place a light on Rebecca Shoal was under the direction of Lt. George Meade starting in 1854. After structures were washed away twice in 1855 while still being erected, Meade wrote, "I believed then, and am satisfied now, that no light-house structure of any kind has been erected, either in this country or in Europe, at a position more exposed and offering greater obstacles than the Rebecca shoal."

A lighthouse was finally successfully erected on Rebecca Shoal in 1886. It was a -story square house set on high pilings. It was often impossible to land supplies or keepers at the lighthouse during bad weather. The lighthouse survived several hurricanes. The 1919 Florida Keys Hurricane broke the glass in the lighthouse's lantern and damaged the lens. The Spanish steamer Valbanera sank in that same hurricane five miles east of Rebecca Shoal, with the loss of all 488 people aboard.

The lighthouse deteriorated after the light was automated in 1926, and was demolished in 1953. A skeletal tower was erected on the original pilings to hold the light. A new skeletal tower was built on new pilings in 1985, and the old tower and pilings removed. The lantern from the old lighthouse eventually ended up mounted on a private lighthouse in Key Largo. Hurricane Charley (2004) destroyed the new tower.

Keepers

 Mark Gaze 1886 – 1888
 James Gardner 1888 – 1889
 Francis McNulty 1889 – 1890
 Robert J. Fine 1890 – 1893
 John Watkins 1893 – 1895
 William R. Cook 1895 – 1896
 Charles H. Gardner 1896 – 1900
 James R. Walker 1900 – 1902
 Alfred A. Berghell 1902 – 1905)
 Arthur C.E. Hamblett 1905 – 1907
 John Peterson 1907 – 1908
 Arthur C.E. Hamblett 1908 – 1910
 Thomas M. Kelly 1910 – 1917
 Clifton H. Lopez 1917
 William Pierce 1917 – 1919
 Richard C. Roberts 1919
 Thomas L. Kelly 1919 – ?
 Robert V. Hall - at least 1921 
 Alonzo Baker – 1925

Notes

References
Florida Lighthouses - Rebecca Shoal Lighthouse - retrieved January 31, 2006
Lighthouse Digest - Rebecca Shoal Light - retrieved January 31, 2006
Florida Lighthouse Page - Rebecca Shoal Lighthouse History - retrieved January 31, 2006
Lighthouse Digest - Mystery of the Lighthouse at Key Largo - retrieved January 31, 2006

Sailing Directions

Lighthouses completed in 1886
Lighthouses in Monroe County, Florida
Buildings and structures demolished in 1953
1886 establishments in Florida
1953 disestablishments in Florida